Buckingham is a second-class township in Wayne County, Pennsylvania, United States. The township's population was 520 at the time of the 2010 United States Census.

History
The Equinunk Historic District and Starlight Station, New York, Ontario, and Western Railway are listed on the National Register of Historic Places.

Geography

Communities
The following villages are located in Buckingham Township:

Autumn Leaves
Balls Eddy (also in Scott Township)
Dillontown
Equinunk (also in Manchester Township)
High Lake (also called Brownsville)
Lake Como (also in Preston Township)
Starlight
Stockport

Demographics

As of the census of 2010, there were 520 people, 260 households, and 148 families residing in the township.  The population density was 11.8 people per square mile (4.6/km2).  There were 523 housing units at an average density of 11.8/sq mi (4.6/km2).  The racial makeup of the township was 97.7% White, 0.2% African American, 0.6% Asian, 0.5% from other races, 1% from two or more races. Hispanic or Latino of any race were 2.5% of the population.

There were 260 households, out of which 13.8% had children under the age of 18 living with them, 44.2% were married couples living together, 6.5% had a female householder with no husband present, and 43.1% were non-families. 35% of all households were made up of individuals, and 18.1% had someone living alone who was 65 years of age or older.  The average household size was 2.00 and the average family size was 2.53.

In the township the population was spread out, with 13.1% under the age of 18, 60.9% from 18 to 64, and 26% who were 65 years of age or older.  The median age was 53.3 years.

The median income for a household in the township was $40,268, and the median income for a family was $54,375. Males had a median income of $36,193 versus $30,000 for females. The per capita income for the township was $26,796.  About 9.9% of families and 11.4% of the population were below the poverty line, including none of those under age 18 and 18.6% of those age 65 or over.

Images

References

Townships in Wayne County, Pennsylvania
Pennsylvania populated places on the Delaware River